The love chair (French siege d'amour) was a device created by a French furniture manufacturer in the early 20th century to allow the corpulent British King Edward VII to have sex with two or more women simultaneously.

History
The chair was first created by Soubrier, a furniture manufacturer, which has now (as of 2018) become the current owner of the device. Prior to this, however, the King was a regular visitor at Le Chabanais in Paris, a French brothel, and the chair was designed specifically for the King's visits there.  The chair allowed him to indulge his sexual fantasies without crushing his female partners. While Peter Hof claimed the chair had never been on public display, the Daily Express reported in 2015 that it was on display in the Musée d'Orsay.

References

Sex toys